Nancy Drew is an American mystery drama television series based on the series of mystery novels about the titular character. The series was adapted for The CW by Noga Landau, Josh Schwartz and Stephanie Savage, and is produced by CBS Studios, in association with Fake Empire. On March 22, 2022, The CW renewed the series for a fourth season which is set to premiere on May 31, 2023, with the series finale scheduled to air on August 23, 2023.

Series overview

Episodes

Season 1 (2019–20)

Season 2 (2021)

Season 3 (2021–22)

Ratings

Season 1

Season 2

Season 3

Notes

References

External links
 
 

Lists of American drama television series episodes
Lists of American horror television series episodes
Lists of American mystery television series episodes